The Yale Bulldogs represents Yale University in ECAC women's ice hockey during the 2017–18 NCAA Division I women's ice hockey season.

Offseason

June 26: Saroya Tinker won a Gold Medal in Ball Hockey with Team Canada.  The World Championship Tournament was held in the Czech Republic.

Recruiting

2015–16 Bulldogs

Standings

Schedule

|-
!colspan=12 style=""| Regular Season

Awards and honors
 Mallory Souliotis, 2017-18 First Team All-Ivy
 Greta Skarzynski, 2017-18 Second Team All-Ivy
 Gianna Meloni, 2017-18 Honorable Mention All-Ivy

References

Yale
Yale Bulldogs women's ice hockey seasons
Yale
Yale